The Seshadri Express is a train in India, named after the Seshadri Hills of Tirupati. The train's inaugural run was between Andhra Pradesh's coastal city of Kakinada to temple pilgrimage city of Tirupati. In 2005, it was extended to Bengaluru in neighbouring Karnataka. This train is considered to be one of the best ways to commute on this route. The Seshadri Express is regarded as a punctual train.

History 
It was started in 2002. Keeping in mind the growing demand for a new train to the pilgrim centre, the government introduced the Seshadri Express in 2002 and extended it up to Bengaluru. The train thus runs through the loop path of Nidadavolu, Tanuku, Bhimavaram, Gudivada, and Vijayawada to cater to the needs of Godavari and Krishna district.

Coach composition 
The Seshadri Express runs between Kakinada and the software capital of India, Bangalore, via Tirupati. It is currently being operated with 17209 / 17210 train numbers. It is one of the busiest trains, running with 20 coaches at full capacity at all times. It has 6 AC, 10 Sleeper, 3 second-class general compartments, and 2 luggage cum brake vans.

Route

 Kakinada Town
 Samarlakota Junction
 Anaparthi
 Rajamahendravaram
 Nidadavolu Junction
 Tanuku
 Attili
 Bhimavaram Town Halt
 Akividu
 Kaikaluru
 Gudivada Junction
 Vijayawada Junction (Locomotive change from WDG-3A (earlier WDP-1A) to WAP-4 and vice-versa)
 Tenali Junction
 Bapatla
 Chirala
 Ongole
 Singarayakonda
 Kavali
 Nellore
 Gudur Junction
 Srikalahasti
 Renigunta Junction
 Tirupati
 Pakala Junction
 Chittoor
 Katpadi Junction
 Gudiyattam
 Vaniyambadi
 Jolarpettai Junction
 Kuppam
 Bangarapete Junction
 Maluru
 Whitefield
 Krishnarajapura
 Sir M. Visvesvaraya Terminal, Bengaluru

*Locomotive is changed at Vijayawada Junction.

Rake sharing
This train shares its rake with SMVT Bengaluru–Nagercoil Express.

Timings

Train 17210 departs Kakinada Town at 17:30 to reach Tirupati at 5:30 am and SVMT Bengaluru at 12:30 pm the next day. 
In return, Train No. 17209, Seshadri Express, has been revised with effect from 30 Jun 2019, and leaves SVMT Bengaluru 11:00 am, Tirupati at 5:15 pm and Kakinada Town at 6:45 am the next day.
Hence, this train acts as a night express between Godavari district places and the pilgrimage centre of Tirupati, and also as an Intercity express between Tirupati and Bangalore.

Gallery

References 

Transport in Bangalore
Transport in Kakinada
Railway services introduced in 2002
Named passenger trains of India
Rail transport in Andhra Pradesh
Express trains in India
Rail transport in Karnataka